The World Federation of Rose Societies (WFRS) is an umbrella association of (as of 2015) 39-member countries' national rose societies.

Although founded in 1968 in London by 8 constituent countries' rose societies, the WFRS did not have a first meeting until 1971, held in New Zealand.

The WFRS maintains or oversees: a Rose Hall of Fame as well as an Old Rose Hall of Fame (an entry in which has been characterised as an honour "as coveted as Michelin's four stars" for rose aficionados); a World Rose directory; a Rose Locator Database targeting the location of rose cultivars; a Breeder's Club; a "garden of excellence" award; the selection of "world's favourite rose" by vote of delegates of its member-countries; a World Rose Show held every three years; and collects world news on the subject of roses. It also publishes an annual Rose Directory and a bi-annual World Rose News bulletin.

Members

References

Rose societies
Organizations established in 1968
Clubs and societies in London
Supraorganizations